Bernard Siegel (April 19, 1868 – July 9, 1940) was an Austro-Hungarian born American character actor, whose career spanned both the silent film era, as well as carrying over into the beginning of sound pictures. His career spanned over 25 years, during which time he performed in over 50 films.

Life and career
Siegel was born in the city of Lemberg (today known as Lviv, Ukraine), in the province of Galicia in the Austria-Hungarian Empire on April 19, 1868. His film career began with a small featured role in the 1913 silent film, The Third Degree (which would be remade in 1919, and again in 1926, the latter film being the first film directed by Michael Curtiz). Over the next 26 years he would appear in almost 70 films, most of those films taking place during the silent era. He would only act in thirteen sound films.

In 1940 Siegel, age 72, died of a heart attack in Los Angeles.

Selected filmography
(Filmography based on the AFI database, with supplemental information from Media Bang)

References

External links

 
 

1868 births
1940 deaths
American male silent film actors
Austria-Hungary
20th-century American male actors
Austro-Hungarian emigrants to the United States